Cesare Bassano (1584–1648) was an Italian painter and engraver. He was born at Milan. He engraved:
 
Portrait of Gaspare Aselli
A Funeral Frontispiece of Francesco Piccolomini 
Nativity.

References

Mark McDonald, 'Cesare Bassano's 1635 Siege of Valenza', Print Quarterly, XXVIII, 2011, pp. 288–92

1584 births
1648 deaths
Artists from Milan
16th-century Italian painters
Italian male painters
17th-century Italian painters
Italian engravers
Renaissance painters